Rajesh Diwakar is a member of the Bharatiya Janata Party who won the 2014 Indian general elections from the Hathras (Lok Sabha constituency). Instead, Rajveer Diler, a sitting MLA, was nominated and became the Member of Parliament representing Hathras.

References

Living people
India MPs 2014–2019
Lok Sabha members from Uttar Pradesh
People from Hathras district
Place of birth missing (living people)
Bharatiya Janata Party politicians from Uttar Pradesh
1971 births